Chippewa Falls Ski Jump was a K40 ski jumping hill located in Chippewa Falls, Wisconsin, United States opened in 1909.

History 
On 24 January 1909, Oscar Gundersen set the only official world record on this hill at 42.1 metres (138 feet).

Ski jumping world record

References

External links
Chippewa Falls Ski Jump skisprungschanzen.com

Ski jumping venues in the United States